Pierre Louis Ramadier (22 May 1902 – 11 June 1983) was a  French pole vaulter. He finished fifth and third at the 1934 and 1938 European Championships, and 17th at the 1936 Summer Olympics.

References

1902 births
1961 deaths
People from Lunel
French male pole vaulters
Athletes (track and field) at the 1928 Summer Olympics
Athletes (track and field) at the 1936 Summer Olympics
Olympic athletes of France
European Athletics Championships medalists
Sportspeople from Hérault
20th-century French people